Diéma Cercle is an administrative subdivision of the Kayes Region of Mali.  Its administrative center (chef-lieu) is the small town of Diéma.  The Cercle is divided into one urban commune and fourteen rural communes. In the 2009 census the cercle had a population of 212,062.

The cercle is divided into 15 communes:

Béma
Diangounté Camara
Dianguirdé
Diéma
Diéoura
Dioumara Koussata
Fassoudébé
Fatao an Urban Commune
Gomitradougou
Grouméra
Guédébiné
Lakamané
Lambidou
Madiga Sacko
Sansankidé

References

Cercles of Mali
Kayes Region